Abkhaz is a language of the Northwest Caucasian family which, like the other Northwest Caucasian languages, is very rich in consonants. Abkhaz has a large consonantal inventory that contrasts 58 consonants in the literary Abzhywa dialect, coupled with just two phonemic vowels.

Abkhaz has three major dialects: Abzhywa, Bzyp and Sadz, which differ mainly in phonology, with the lexical differences being due to contact with neighbouring languages.

Consonants
Below is the IPA phoneme chart of the consonant phonemes of Abkhaz:

Phonemes preceded by an asterisk (*) are found in the Bzyp and Sadz dialects of Abkhaz, but not in Abzhywa; phonemes preceded by a  dagger (†) are unique to the Bzyp dialect. The total number of consonant phonemes in Abkhaz is, therefore, 58 in the Abzhywa dialect, 60 in the Sadz dialect, and 67 in Bzyp.

The obstruents are characterised by a three-fold contrast between voiced, aspirated voiceless and glottalised forms; both the aspirated and glottalised forms are not strong, unless they are being emphasised by the speaker. The glottal stop may be analysed as a separate phoneme by some, since it can be distinguish certain pairs as áaj 'yes', and ʔaj 'no', and it can also be an allophonic variant of [qʼ] in intervocalic positions. Some speakers also pronounce the word /aˈpʼa/ with a [fʼ], but it is not encountered anywhere else.

The consonants highlighted in red are the 4 kinds of labialisation found in Abkhaz. For this reason most Abkhaz linguists prefer using º to represent them in general instead of the standard IPA symbol. The -type is found with the velar stops and uvular stops and fricatives. The labial-palatal rounding involves the alveolar, pharyngeal and palatal fricatives. The one found in the dental-alveolar affricates and fricatives is described as an endo-labiodental articulation. The -type is found in the dental stops, where there is full bilabial closure.

The non-pharyngealised dorsal fricatives of Abkhaz may be realised as either velar or uvular depending upon the context in which they are found; here, they have been ranged with the uvulars. Also, while the labialised palatal approximant  is here placed with the approximants, it is actually the reflex of a labialised voiced pharyngeal fricative, preserved in Abaza, and a legacy of this phoneme's origin is a slight constriction of the pharynx for some speakers, resulting in the phonetic realisation .

Vowels
Abkhaz has only two distinctive vowels: an open vowel  and a close vowel .

Dialects 
The Sadz dialect has distinctive consonant gemination; for example, Sadz Abkhaz contrasts  ('ashes') vs.  ('worm'), where Abzhywa and Bzyp Abkhaz have only the one form  for both; it seems that many Sadz singletons reflect positions where a consonant has been dropped from the beginning of a cluster in the Proto-Northwest Caucasian form (compare Ubykh  'ashes'). Some scholars (for instance) prefer to count the Sadz consonant inventory at well over 100 (thus forming the largest consonant inventory in the Caucasus, outstripping Ubykh's 80–84) by treating the geminated consonants as a set in their own right. (Note, however, that this practice is not usual in counting the consonant inventory of a language.)

The Bzyp consonant inventory appears to have been the fundamental inventory of Proto-Abkhaz, with the inventories of Abzhywa and Sadz being reduced from this total, rather than the Bzyp series being innovative. Plain alveolopalatal affricates and fricatives have merged with their corresponding alveolars in Abzhywa and Sadz Abkhaz (compare Bzyp  'to know' vs. Abzhywa ), and in Abzhywa the labialised alveolopalatal fricatives have merged with the corresponding postalveolars (compare Bzyp  'to measure' vs. Abzhywa ).

References

Notes

Further reading
 Yuri B. Korakov, Atlas of Caucasian languages (PDF).

Phonology
Northwest Caucasian phonologies